John Earl Hyten (born July 18, 1959) is a retired United States Air Force general who served as the 11th vice chairman of the Joint Chiefs of Staff from 2019 to 2021. A career space operations and acquisitions officer, he commanded the United States Strategic Command from 2016 to 2019 and the Air Force Space Command from 2014 to 2016.

Hyten was born in Torrance, California. After graduating from Harvard University, he received his commission into the U.S. Air Force in 1981. He started his military career in engineering jobs, then went into space and missile operations. He commanded the 6th Space Operations Squadron, 595th Space Group, and 50th Space Wing.

After retiring, Hyten joined Blue Origin as a strategic advisor.

Early life and education 
John Earl Hyten was born on July 18, 1959, in Torrance, California as the eldest of Sherwyn and Barbara Hyten's three children. In 1965, his family moved to Huntsville, Alabama, where his father worked on the Saturn V rocket. He grew up in Huntsville at the height of the Space Race, attending Chaffee Elementary School and Grissom High School, two of the three schools named after the Apollo 1 astronauts who died during a launch rehearsal test. In 1977, he graduated from Grissom High School. He wanted to become an astronaut, but because of his poor eyesight, decided to pursue engineering "to get in the space business."

Hyten got accepted into Harvard University, but unable to pay for it, he accepted an Air Force Reserve Officer Training Corps scholarship that required him to serve in the United States Air Force for four years. He graduated from Harvard in 1981 with a bachelor's degree in engineering and applied sciences. After graduating, he commissioned into the Air Force as a second lieutenant, intending to serve only for four years and get out in 1985 to work in the space industry.

In 1985, Hyten received a Master of Business Administration from Auburn University at Montgomery. He completed Squadron Officer School in 1985 as a distinguished graduate. From 1993 to 1994, he studied at the Air Command and Staff College in Maxwell Air Force Base, Alabama. In 1999, he became a national defense fellow of the University of Illinois. In 2011, he returned to Harvard, taking their Senior Managers in Government Course.

Military career

Hyten was commissioned into the United States Air Force on August 23, 1981, as a second lieutenant. His career includes assignments in a variety of space acquisition and operations positions. He served in senior engineering positions on both Air Force and Army anti-satellite weapon system programs. He initially wanted to serve for four years but decided to stay after getting the opportunity to work in the space 
and missile defense program.

Hyten's staff assignments include tours with the Air Force Secretariat, the Air Staff, the Joint Staff and the Commander's Action Group at Headquarters Air Force Space Command as Director. He served as mission director in Cheyenne Mountain and was the last active-duty commander of the 6th Space Operations Squadron at Offutt Air Force Base, Nebraska. In 2006, he deployed to Southwest Asia as Director of Space Forces for operations Enduring Freedom and Iraqi Freedom. Hyten commanded the 595th Space Group and the 50th Space Wing at Schriever Air Force Base, Colo. Prior to assuming command of Air Force Space Command, he served as the Vice Commander, Air Force Space Command.

On March 15, 2013, it was announced that Hyten had been nominated to be Commander, Fourteenth Air Force and Joint Functional Component Command for Space, U.S. Strategic Command. This would have had him exchanging jobs with the incumbent Lieutenant General Susan J. Helms. However, Helms' nomination was put on hold by Missouri Senator Claire McCaskill resulting in the withdrawal of the nomination and leading to the retirement of Helms. On April 9, 2014, Hyten was confirmed by the Senate for promotion to the rank of General and appointment as Commander, Air Force Space Command.  Before assuming command of the United States Strategic Command on November 3, 2016, Hyten commanded Air Force Space Command.

United States Strategic Command

Hyten was nominated for reassignment to head the United States Strategic Command on September 8, 2016. This nomination was confirmed by the U.S. Senate on September 28, 2016 after a confirmation hearing before the Senate Committee on Armed Services on September 20. The change of command ceremony occurred on November 3.

In November 2017, Hyten stated that if he determines Donald Trump's order for a nuclear strike to be illegal, then "I'm going to say: 'Mr President, that's illegal.' And guess what he's going to do? He's going to say, 'What would be legal?' And we'll come up with options, of a mix of capabilities to respond to whatever the situation is, and that's the way it works."

Hyten has been a strong proponent for developing advanced hypersonic weapons, saying they would enable "responsive, long-range, strike options against distant, defended, and/or time-critical threats [such as road-mobile missiles] when other forces are unavailable, denied access, or not preferred.”

Vice Chairman of the Joint Chiefs of Staff

In April 2019, Hyten was nominated to be Vice Chairman of the Joint Chiefs of Staff. The U.S. Senate confirmed him on September 26, 2019, by a vote of 75–22. He assumed duties as the Vice Chairman on November 21, 2019, making him the second highest-ranking military officer in the U.S. Armed Forces. From February 2, 2019, Hyten also served as the senior designated official of the Electromagnetic Spectrum Operations Cross Functional Team.

Hyten has stated that he hopes to reduce overclassification in the Department of Defense.

It was announced that by the year of 2021 Hyten is expected to retire and would not seek a second-term as vice chairman of the Joint Chiefs of Staff. With the absence of a selected nominee to succeed Hyten, Department of Defense officials stated in October 2021 that Hyten would delegate his duties to senior officials on the Joint Staff if a nominee was not confirmed by his retirement date in November. U.S. Navy Adm. Christopher Grady succeeded Hyten as vice chairman of the Joint Chiefs of Staff upon the confirmation of his nomination to the post by the U.S. Senate on December 16, 2021.

Hyten retired from active duty on November 19, 2021.

Sexual misconduct allegation

In July 2019, an unnamed senior military officer spoke to the Associated Press accusing the general of sexual misconduct in 2017 while she was one of his aides. The officer claimed the unwanted touching and kissing happened during the 2017 Reagan National Defense Forum in California and several times during the year while working as his aide. The officer told the Associated Press: "My life was ruined by this".

The Air Force Office of Special Investigations opened an investigation, which included interviews with fifty-three witnesses and a review of tens of thousands of emails. The investigation found no evidence or information to substantiate the allegations. The court martial convening authority, General Mike Holmes, declined to take any action given the lack of supporting evidence concerning the allegations.

The accuser identified herself as Colonel Kathryn A. Spletstoser, former Director, Commander's Action Group, United States Strategic Command, on July 26, 2019.

On July 30, Hyten appeared before the Senate Armed Services Committee for his confirmation hearing for Vice Chairman of the Joint Chiefs, following five closed-door sessions.  No members of the committee supported the accusations in the public hearing, with Senator Martha McSally stating that "sexual assault happens in the military.  It just didn't happen in this case" and that "the full truth was revealed in this process... General Hyten is innocent of these charges."

Club for Future 

Personal life
Hyten is married to Laura Hyten.

Assignments

Awards and decorations

Other achievements

 1991 Recipient of the William Jump Award for Excellence within the Federal Government
 1998 Recipient of a Laurels Award, Aviation Week & Space Technology Magazine
 2009 Gen. Jerome F. O'Malley Distinguished Space Leadership Award
 2014 Dr. Wernher Von Braun Space Flight Trophy 
 2014 General Thomas D. White Space Award 
 2018 Dr. Robert H. Goddard Memorial Trophy

Promotions

Writings

References

Bibliography

External links

 

|-

|-
 

|-

|-

|-

Harvard School of Engineering and Applied Sciences alumni
Auburn University at Montgomery alumni
Living people
United States Air Force generals
Recipients of the Defense Distinguished Service Medal
Recipients of the Air Force Distinguished Service Medal
Recipients of the Legion of Merit
Military personnel from Huntsville, Alabama
1950s births
Vice Chairmen of the Joint Chiefs of Staff